Mahmudabad Mazaheri (also Romanized as Maḩmūdābād Maz̧āherī and Mahmood Abad Mazaheri; also known as Maḩmūdābād and Moḩammadābād) is a village in Ganjabad Rural District, Esmaili District, Anbarabad County, Kerman Province, Iran. At the 2006 census, its population was 21, in 4 families.

References 

Populated places in Anbarabad County